

Overview

The single for "I Wanna Be Your Doll" was the only Rachel Stamp single to be released via the Snapper/Madfish label. The release of the single was followed by a tour of the UK titled the "Permanent Damage Tour". A promotional video, directed by Corin Hardy was made to promote the single.

CD Single 
Released March 2, 1999
(SMASCD104)

Track listing
 I Wanna Be Your Doll
 Girl You're Just A Slave To Your Man
 Calling All Destroyers

Facts 
 This was the band’s only release through the Madfish/Snapper label.
 The single was only released on CD and reached Number 15 in the NME Indie chart and 160 in the UK Singles Chart.
 The single’s cover was inspired by a photo of Marlena Dietrich.
 "I Wanna Be Your Doll" – produced, engineered and mixed by John Fryer – was also included on the band's debut album, "Hymns For Strange Children".
 A live version of "Girl, You're Just A Slave To Your Man" was included on the "Stampax" album.
 “Calling All Destroyers” is a cover of a T. Rex song from their "Futuristic Dragon" album, released in 1976.
 Tracks 2 and 3 were recorded by Harvey Birrell.

Promotional Video

 The promotional video for "I Wanna Be Your Doll" was directed by Corin Hardy. The video was banned by MTV due to scenes of doll mutilation.
 David Ryder-Prangley: "...rejected by MTV for having scenes of dolls being mutilated. Features me, Will and Robin..." (taken from a fansite interview, 2004) [1]

References
[1] Rachel Stamp Videography

External links
 "I Wanna Be Your Doll" Promotional Video on YouTube

1999 singles
Rachel Stamp songs
1999 songs